Chen Binbin (born 10 June 1998) is a Chinese footballer who currently plays for Shanghai Port, of the Chinese Super League.

Club career
Chen Binbin started his football career when he joined Shanghai SIPG's youth academy in 2014 after Shanghai International Port Group bought the club and under-17 team from Xu Genbao. He was promoted to the first team squad by then manager André Villas-Boas in the 2017 season. He made his debut for the club on 9 July 2017 in a 4–2 away loss against Changchun Yatai. He scored his first goal for the club on 17 July 2019 in a 3–0 home win against Hebei China Fortune His contract with Shanghai SIPG runs until 2024. 

On 11th August 2022 Chen Binbin signed for J3 League side Kataller Toyama on loan until December 31st 2022.

International career
Chen made his debut for the Chinese national team on 26 May 2018 in a 1–0 win against Myanmar, coming on as a substitute for Huang Zichang in the 76th minute.

Career statistics

Club statistics
.

International statistics

Honours

Club
Shanghai SIPG
Chinese Super League: 2018
Chinese FA Super Cup: 2019

References

External links
 
 

1998 births
Living people
Chinese footballers
Footballers from Henan
People from Xinyang
Shanghai Port F.C. players
Chinese Super League players
Association football midfielders
China international footballers
Footballers at the 2018 Asian Games
Asian Games competitors for China